Henricus montuosus is a species of moth of the family Tortricidae. It is found in Costa Rica.

The wingspan is about 20 mm. The ground colour of the forewings is yellowish white with a greenish hue, but paler in the basal third where violet-grey refraction is present. The markings are grey black darker edged and suffused. The hindwings are whitish, mixed with brownish terminally and with grey strigulation (fine streaks) in the distal half.

References

Moths described in 2002
Henricus (moth)